Allfrey is a surname. Notable people with the surname include:

Charles Walter Allfrey (1895–1964), British Army general in World War II
Ellah Wakatama Allfrey (born 1966), literary editor and publisher
Phyllis Shand Allfrey (1908–1986), Dominican author and politician